Muhammad Ryaan bin Sanizal (born 31 May 2002) is a Singaporean professional footballer who plays as a centre-back or full-back for Singapore Premier League club Tampines Rovers and the Singapore national team.

Club career
He was nominated for the Dollah Salleh award in 2018 but failed to win it. 

He was the youngest player in the Tampines Rovers squad when he signed for them for the 2019 season.

International career
Ryaan represented Singapore at under-15 to under-23 levels.

Ryaan was first called up to the senior side in 2022, for the FAS Tri-Nations Series 2022 against Malaysia and Philippines on 26 and 29 March 2022 respectively. However, he did not play in any of the matches. Ryaan made his full international debut on 14 June 2022 against Myanmar where he started the game.

Career statistics

Club

International

International caps

U23 International caps

References

Living people
2002 births
Singaporean footballers
Association football midfielders
Singapore Premier League players
Young Lions FC players
Tampines Rovers FC players
Competitors at the 2021 Southeast Asian Games
Southeast Asian Games competitors for Singapore